Litos is a nickname, and may refer to:
Litos (footballer, born 1967), Portuguese former football midfielder and coach
Litos (footballer, born January 1974), Portuguese former football goalkeeper
Litos (footballer, born February 1974), Portuguese former football defender

Litos is a town, and may refer to:
Litos, Spanish town in the province of Zamora.

See also
Lito (disambiguation), given name